Nick Reynolds is a British sculptor, best known for his creation of death masks. He is the son of Bruce Reynolds, the mastermind of the Great Train Robbery. Reynolds and his work were the subject of radio program Death Masks: The Undying Face broadcast by the BBC in September 2017.

Reynolds also plays harmonica in Alabama 3, the London-based group that created The Sopranos' theme song.

References

Living people
British sculptors
British male sculptors
Year of birth missing (living people)